General Dudung Abdurachman OLH (born 19 November 1965) is an Indonesian Army general who currently serves as the Chief of Staff of the Indonesian Army (Kasad). He graduated from the Indonesian Military Academy (Akmil) in 1988 beginning his career in the infantry. He was appointed as Commander of Kodam Jaya on 27 July 2020, then in 25 May 2021, appointed as commander of the Kostrad. 

Dudung gained media attention in late 2020 for his anti-Islamism statements and standoff against radical groups such as the Islamic Defenders Front (FPI). Furthermore, as Commander of Kodam Jaya, he instructed soldiers under his command to take down provocative banners and posters related to the Islamic Defenders Front (FPI) throughout Jakarta, due to the inability of the civilian authorities. This action then sparked controversy.

References 

Indonesian generals
People from Bandung
1965 births
Living people
Controversies in Indonesia